The pin-tailed parrotfinch (Erythrura prasina) is a common species of estrildid finch found in Southeast Asia: Malaysia, Brunei, Cambodia, Indonesia, Laos, Burma, Vietnam, Thailand and China. It has an estimated global extent of occurrence of 10,000,000 km2.

It is found in subtropical/tropical in both montane and lowland moist forest, and is also found in bamboo thickets and rice plantations. Flocks of this species can do great damage to rice crops, and in parts of its range it is classed as a pest. The IUCN has classified the species as being of least concern. It is a popular cage bird.

On August 2, 2007, scientists on an expedition to the upper ranges of Mount Mantalingahan in southern Palawan province in the Philippines announced the discovery, with other animals, of the pin-tailed parrot finch, according to Dr. Lawrence Heaney, a biologist from the Chicago Field Museum.

Origin
Origin and phylogeny has been obtained by Antonio Arnaiz-Villena et al.. Estrildinae may have originated in India and dispersed thereafter (towards Africa and Pacific Ocean habitats).

References

External links 
Pin-tailed Parrotfinch Species Profile

pin-tailed parrotfinch
Birds of Southeast Asia
pin-tailed parrotfinch
Taxa named by Anders Sparrman